Radio Tarang was a radio station based in Hisar city of Haryana, India. It was started in 2007 and was owned by Vivek Singhal of Singla Properties. It became non-operational on 12 September 2008 and on 17 July 2009, its license was revoked.

During its run, it was the first regional FM channel in India to broadcast British Broadcasting Corporation content on it.

See also 
 All India Radio Hisar
 BIG FM 92.7
 CCS HAU Community Radio Station
 DD Haryana
 Radio Dhamaal
 Radio Mantra

References 

Radio stations in Haryana
Hindi-language radio stations
Hisar (city)